The Dalmatian derby is the name given to matches between Hajduk Split and Šibenik. It is a regional derby between football clubs from central Dalmatia’s two largest cities, Split and Šibenik. The teams are supported by their fanbases called Split's Torcida and Šibenik's Funcuti.

In these derbies the hostility is expressed between people from Split and Šibenik among themselves, because most of the inhabitants from the urban part of the city are fans of Šibenik, and from the surrounding area the supporters of Hajduk. Not infrequently this hostility could bring incidents in these games, but they pass without a large number of injured people. These derbies were played regularly since the formation of Croatian First Football League, until 2003 when Šibenik was relegated to the Croatian Second Football League and played again in 2006 when it returned to the Croatian First Football League and again regularly until 2012 when Šibenik got relegated again. These two teams have met in the final of the 2009–10 Croatian Cup when Hajduk won both matches and won the trophy which was the peak of the rivalry so far. 

The derby was also played off the field, because the Hajduk's debts towards Šibenik from money of the transfer of Ante Rukavina. Hajduk was suspended many times and threatened with not playing official matches, but the suspension was delayed many times. But it all ended well for Hajduk, which is no longer under threat of suspension since it paid debts to Šibenik.

Results
The most recent game was played on 16 May 2021 at Poljud, in the 35th round of the 2020–21 Prva HNL season. Hajduk won 2–0 with goals from Marko Livaja and Marin Jakoliš.

Last updated on 29 January 2022

Note: Home team's score always shown first

Key

1950–1992

1992–present

1 Match abandoned after 81 minutes due to supporters pitch invasion in an attempt to attack players. Therefore, the match was awarded to Šibenik and Hajduk got punished with their home matches being played behind closed doors until the end of 1999–2000 season.

Player and manager records

Top scorers
Updated up to the last derby played on 1 August 2021

6 goals
 Tomislav Erceg (Hajduk Split)

5 goals
 Mate Baturina (Hajduk Split)
 Senijad Ibričić (Hajduk Split)

4 goals
 Nikola Kalinić (Hajduk Split)
 Ardian Kozniku (Hajduk Split)
 Igor Musa (Hajduk Split)
 Klaudio Vuković  (Šibenik)

Players who have scored in Dalmatian derby for both clubs
 Dean Računica

Players who have played for both clubs (senior career)

 Eduard Abazi
 Ante Aračić
 Stipe Bačelić-Grgić
 Stipe Balajić
 Mate Baturina
 Joško Bilić
 Slaven Bilić
 Goran Blažević
 Dario Brgles
 Mario Budimir
 Josip Bulat
 Niko Čeko
 Vedran Celiščak
 Nikica Cukrov
 Ivo Cuzzi
 Mate Dragičević
 Darko Dražić
 Tomislav Erceg
 Dalibor Filipović
 Anthony Grdić
 Ante Hrgović
 Ante Ivica
 Antonio Jakoliš
 Marin Jakoliš
 Ivan Jurić
 Nikola Kalinić
 Igor Lozo
 Krešimir Makarin
 Mate Maleš
 Zvonimir Milić
 Alen Mrzlečki
 Petar Nadoveza
 Mario Novaković
 Boris Pandža
 Matko Perdijić
 Mladen Pralija
 Jurica Puljiz
 Denis Putnik
 Ivan Radeljić
 Dean Računica
 Božidar Radošević
 Krunoslav Rendulić
 Ante Režić
 Ivan Rodić
 Zoran Roglić
 Ante Rukavina
 Zlatko Runje
 Emir Sahiti
 Mate Selak
 Zoran Slavica
 Vjeran Simunić
 Dragan Stojkić
 Duje Špalj
 Petar Šuto
 Frane Vitaić
 Tonči Žilić

Managers who have worked at both clubs
 Luka Bonačić
 Ivan Buljan
 Nikica Cukrov
 Ivica Kalinić
 Ivan Katalinić
 Petar Nadoveza
 Ivan Pudar

Head-to-head league results

The table lists the place each team took in each of the seasons.

References

External links
Archive of Hajduk's games at Hajduk.hr  

HNK Hajduk Split
Football derbies in Croatia
HNK Šibenik